The Countess of the Palatinate was the consort of the Count of the Palatinate, one of the Empire's greatest princes.

Non-Hereditary, 1085–1156

House of Hohenstaufen, 1156–1195

House of Welf, 1195–1214

House of Wittelsbach, 1214–1356

Sources

The Palatinate
The Palatinate